The Battle of Khirbet Al-Joz was fought between forces of the Syrian Army and the FSA for control of the town. On 6 October 2012, the FSA launched an attack on the government occupied village of Kherbet Eljoz, near the Turkish border. The FSA took control of the village after a 12-hour-long battle with government forces.

Background
In June 2011, the Syrian military attacked the town, with 40 tanks in a crackdown against supposed pro-democracy protesters.

Battle

Rebel offensive
On 6 October, rebels launched an offensive on the border village Khirbet al-Joz in the Idlib Governorate. The FSA was said to first attacked a government border outpost just west of the village. Which left 3 rebels and 15 government soldiers dead. Fighting later intensified in Khirbet al-Joz itself, as rebels attempted to retake the village. Activists claimed that the rebels had captured a 3-story high water tower in the center of Khirbet al-Joz, after 12 hours of fighting with government forces.

On 7 October, the FSA released a statement indicating that they have taken full control of Khirbet al-Joz and its surroundings. The Syrian Observatory for Human Rights confirmed the capture and put the number of dead at 40 soldiers, including 5 officers and 9 rebels.

Aftermath
In late October, the Syrian army conducted a series of airstrikes on rebel positions near Khirbet al-Joz.

References

Military operations of the Syrian civil war in 2012
Idlib Governorate in the Syrian civil war
Battles of the Syrian civil war